Kavadiyattam is a 1993 Indian Malayalam-language comedy film,  directed by Aniyan and written by B. Sreeraj. The film stars Jayaram, Jagathy Sreekumar, Siddique, Suchitra and Sindhuja in the lead roles. The film had musical score by Mohan Sithara and lyrics by O. N. V. Kurup.

Plot
Unni is in the army, but does not wish to stay there. He feigns a mental illness to get discharged, but has to continue to put on the show in front of his family and villagers when he reaches back home.

Cast

Jayaram as Unni
Jagathy Sreekumar as Pazhamkanji Velappan
Siddique as PC Keshava Kuruppu
Sindhuja as Meenu
Suchitra as Thankamani
Kalpana as Dolly
Kaviyoor Ponnamma as Seethalakshmi
Mamukkoya as Koya
Zainuddin as Nariaparampil Mathukutty
Babu Namboothiri as Raman Nair
Krishnankutty Nair as Valiya Kuruppu
Usharani as Kuruppu's wife
Indrans as Tea Shop Employee
Narendra Prasad as Husband of Seethalakshmi
N. L. Balakrishnan as neighbour of Seethalakshmi
Joby A S
Vettoor Purushan
E. A. Rajendran

Music
"Varthingal Pulkannadi" - K. J. Yesudas
"Thengin Melkeranatharanu" - C. C. Anto
"Thengin Melkeranatharanu" - C. C. Anto
"Kattuthulli Kayalolam" - K. J. Yesudas, S. Janaki

References

External links
 
 

1993 films
1990s Malayalam-language films
Films scored by Mohan Sithara